The Saskatchewan Summer Games and Saskatchewan Winter Games are multi-sport events held in the Canadian province of Saskatchewan. The governing body for the Saskatchewan Games is the Saskatchewan Games Council, a non-profit organization who has held responsibility for organizing the Games since 2006.

The Saskatchewan Games have been cancelled since 2020 due to the COVID-19 pandemic.

History 
The games began in 1972 when Roy Romanow, then Minister in charge of the Saskatchewan Youth Agency, announced the beginning of the games. The first summer games were held in 1972 in Moose Jaw, and the first winter games were held two years later in North Battleford.

The 2020 Saskatchewan Summer Games had been scheduled to be held in Lloydminster. They were postponed to 2021 due to the COVID-19 pandemic, but on December 21, 2020, it was announced that the games had been cancelled in full due to continued health and safety concerns. Lloydminster received the right of first refusal to host the 2024 Games, which it accepted. In January 2022, the 2022 Saskatchewan Winter Games were also cancelled due to COVID-19, citing the current Omicron variant and advice from public health officials.

Host cities 
Citing that they typically bid for national and international events, and to encourage the Games to be held in smaller cities, Regina and Saskatoon are ineligible to bid for any Saskatchewan Games. An exception was made for the 2022 Saskatchewan Winter Games, which were awarded for the first time to Regina; the Saskatchewan Games Council cited the impact of the COVID-19 pandemic on smaller cities, and as being a special occasion to mark the 50th anniversary of the Saskatchewan Games. However, this became moot when the Games were ultimately cancelled.

Sports

Summer sports 

Source:

Winter sports 

Source:

Participating teams 
Nine district teams, each representing a different region of Saskatchewan, participate in each instalment of the games. Two of the teams (Regina and Saskatoon) represent the provinces main urban centres, while the other seven teams represent a mix of urban and rural athletes. The district teams, ordered by population, and the cities they include are listed as follows.

 Team Saskatoon (Saskatoon) – 266,141
 Team Regina (Regina) – 226,404
 Team Lakeland (Melfort, Prince Albert) – 124,837
 Team Prairie Central (Humboldt, Martensville, Warman) – 118,729
 Team Rivers West (Lloydminster, Meadow Lake, North Battleford) – 110,432
 Team South West (Moose Jaw, Swift Current) – 101,114
 Team South East (Estevan, Weyburn) – 88,152
 Team Parkland Valley (Melville, Yorkton) – 60,718
 Team North (Flin Flon) – 35,988

Medal tables 

Source:

Flag points winner: Regina

Source:

Flag points winner: Saskatoon

Source:

Flag points winner: Saskatoon

Source:

Flag points winner: Saskatoon

Source:

See also 
Canada Games
Canada Summer Games
Canada Winter Games
Western Canada Summer Games
BC Games
BC Summer Games
BC Winter Games
Alberta Winter Games
Manitoba Games
Ontario Games
Quebec Games

References 

1972 establishments in Canada
1972 establishments in Saskatchewan
Multi-sport events in Canada
Recurring sporting events established in 1972
Biennial sporting events